Magha is the eleventh month of the Hindu calendar, corresponding to January/February of the Gregorian calendar. In India's national civil calendar, Magha is also the eleventh month of the year, beginning on 20 January and ending on 18 February.

In the Hindu lunisolar calendar, Magha may begin on either the new moon or the full moon around the same time of year. It is named thus because in this month, the full moon is usually found nearby or within the star cluster called Magha. Since the traditional Hindu calendar follows the lunar cycle, Magha's start and end dates vary from year to year, unlike the months of the Hindu solar calendars. Magha is a winter (Shishir Ritu) month.

The lunar month of Magha overlaps with the solar month of Makara, which begins with the Sun's entry into Capricorn.

Festivals
 Shukla Panchami: Vasant Panchami
 Shukla Saptami: Ratha Saptami
 Maagh Mela is an important festival celebrated most of North India.
 The world-famous  "Maha Maham" festival which is held every 12 years during full moon day of this month of "maasi".
 Makar Sankranti
 Shukla Ashtami is called as Bhishma Ashtami. It is the day on which Bhishma son of Ganga, was born.

See also

 Astronomical basis of the Hindu calendar
Hindu units of measurement
 Hindu astronomy
 Jyotisha
 Shevat

References

11